Mahjabin Qazalbash ,(1958 - 26 February 2020) was a Pashto singer from Peshawar, Khyber Pakhtunkhwa, Pakistan. She also sang in other languages including Urdu, Punjabi, Hindko, Sindhi, Seraiki, Persian and Turkish. She earned the title of Bulbul-i-Sarhad for her melodious voice. and was recipient of numerous awards, including President’s Pride of Performance. She also worked in Pashto plays, but focused on her singing.

Personal life 
She was born in Peshawer, Pakistan in 1958. Her real name was Surraya Begum.  Her father was of Turko-Persian Qazalbash origin, who had migrated to Peshawar from Qandahar, Afghanistan. She started singing at the age of 13. She was married to Amanullah Khan Orakzai alias Aimal Khan who was a Pashto film actor.

Career 
She started singing when she was studying at school, as her teachers encouraged her to sing. Afterwards, she started her career at Radio Pakistan Peshawar, and later at Pakistan Television.

Death 
Mahjabin Qazalbash died on 26 February 2020 in Peshawar.  She left behind two sons and a daughter.

References

External links
Pashto Music

Pakistani women singers
Pashtun music
Pashtun people